Jerry Woodall (born 1938) is an American inventor and scientist best known for his invention of the first commercially viable heterojunction material GaAlAs for red LEDs used in automobile brake lights and traffic lights, CD and DVD players, TV remote controls and computer networks. He is a recipient of US National Medal of Technology and Innovation for "his pioneering role in the research and development of compound semiconductor materials and devices..."

Born in Washington, DC, Woodall received a BS in Metallurgy from Massachusetts Institute of Technology in 1960 and a PhD in Electrical Engineering from Cornell University in 1982. He worked at IBM's Thomas J. Watson Research Center where he was appointed IBM Fellow in 1985. He was elected to National Academy of Engineering (NAE) in 1989, and Honorary Member of The Electrochemical Society (ECS) in 2007. He is also the fellow of American Vacuum Society (AVS), Institute of Electrical and Electronics Engineers (IEEE) and American Physical Society (APS).

He was awarded the Acheson Award by the Electrochemical Society in 1998. He was awarded the IEEE Electron Devices Society (EDS) Millennium Medal in 2000, and IEEE Jun-ichi Nishizawa Medal “For pioneering contributions to the LPE in the GaAs/AlGaAs systems, including applications to photonic and electronic devices” in 2005.

References

1938 births
Living people
American inventors
American electrical engineers
Cornell University alumni
Purdue University faculty
IBM employees
IBM Fellows
Fellows of the American Physical Society
Presidents of the Electrochemical Society